"Groove Is in the Heart" is a song by American dance band Deee-Lite, released in August 1990 as their debut and lead single from their first album, World Clique (1990). Written and produced by the band, it was a hit in many countries, reaching number-one in Australia and on both the Canadian RPM and US Billboard dance charts. Today it is widely recognized as a classic of its genre.

Background
Though the album version was not recorded until 1990, the song was originally written in the late 1980s; it was performed live as early as 1989. The backing track was built around many samples, primarily the main riff from Herbie Hancock's track "Bring Down the Birds" from the Blowup soundtrack and Vernon Burch's "Get Up", which provided the drum track and also formed the basis for the breakdown featuring a slide whistle. Parliament-Funkadelic bassist Bootsy Collins provided guest vocals, and the rap is provided by Q-Tip of A Tribe Called Quest.

Chart performance
An immediate smash in nightclubs, the song went to number-one on the US Hot Dance Club Play chart and also hit number four on the Billboard Hot 100. It peaked at number-one for one week in Australia in November 1990, while it reached number two in New Zealand.

In the UK, the record was equally popular and was released as a double A-side with "What Is Love", and, with the UK single released with the subtitle "peanut butter mix" (because the single was heavily edited and completely omitted the contributions by Bootsy Collins and Q-Tip), it eventually reached number two during September 1990. Its placing second was due to a rule instituted in the UK Singles Chart in the 1980s, which settled any "ties" over chart positions due to equal sales: the single with sales that had increased most from the previous week would reside above the other, controversially giving "The Joker" by the Steve Miller Band the top place. Following complaints from Deee-Lite's record company, WEA, the rule, of which this song had been the only victim, was scrapped and joint positions were once again allowed. However, it turned out that the 2,595 panel sales that both records achieved for this week of September 15, 1990, had been rounded up, with chart compilers Gallup later releasing the data that showed that the Steve Miller Band hit was indeed a fraction ahead (selling about eight copies more than Deee-Lite). "The Joker" spent a second week at the number-one spot and thereafter convincingly outsold "Groove Is in the Heart".

In Europe, the single entered the top 10 also in Finland (9), Greece (3), Ireland (8), Italy (7), the Netherlands (10) and Spain (8), as well as on the Eurochart Hot 100 Singles, where it peaked at number five in September 1990. Additionally, it was a top 20 hit in Belgium (19), Germany (17) and Switzerland (13), while it peaked within the top 30 in Austria (25). "Groove Is in the Heart" earned a gold record in the US, after 500,000 singles were sold. In Australia and the UK, it earned a platinum record, when 70,000 and 600,000 units, respectively, were sold.

Critical reception
Upon the release, J.D. Considine from The Baltimore Sun found that "Groove Is in the Heart" "bounces happily from rap to funk to house without losing either momentum or its sense of humor." Bill Coleman from Billboard wrote, "Sometimes you can believe the hype. Hot New York City underground dance trio more than lives up to prerelease push with this sizzling groove'n'sample funk jam, kicked into gear by the sultry and charismatic vocal presence of future diva Lady Miss Kier." He also added, "'Groove' is, well, very groovy. A house-paced track with a hip-hop sensibility." Bevan Hannan from The Canberra Times described the song as "good fun". David Giles from Music Week said it's a "fine single". He added, "Pure Seventies funk with a Nineties groove." Helen Mead from NME stated that it is "playfully funky". A reviewer from People Magazine noted it as "hopping". Ross Grady from The Rice Thresher said it is "one of the creamiest slabs of vinyl ever to come from the house music scene." Caroline Sullivan from Smash Hits wrote that the "ripping floor filler" has "got the samples and twiddly electronoises so necessary for dancefloor success nowadays, but there's also a hummable melody and sense of humour about it all." NME and The Village Voices Pazz & Jop annual critics' poll named "Groove Is in the Heart" the best single released in the year 1990.

Retrospective response
AllMusic editor Ned Raggett wrote in his review of World Clique, "Its reputation may rest on only one hit single -- but what a hit. "Groove Is in the Heart" defined the summer of 1990 on radio and MTV with its delicious combination of funk, modern dance sheen, and Lady Miss Kier's smart, sharp diva ways. Add in guest vocals and bass from Bootsy Collins (a pity his hilarious video cameo wasn't represented here), brass from the original Horny Horns duo of Fred Wesley and Maceo Parker, and a smooth mid-song rap from A Tribe Called Quest's Q-Tip, and the results sounded good then and now." In 2017, Stopera and Galindo from BuzzFeed declared it as a "perfect little slice of the early '90s New York club scene." NME called it a "pretty faultless collage of G-Funk, Daisy Age hip-hop, salsa and dippy disco." In 2006, Slant Magazine ranked the song third in its 100 Greatest Dance Songs list, writing: "No song delivered the group's world-conscious Word as colorfully and open-heartedly as 'Groove Is in the Heart,' which flew up the Billboard charts while goosing stuffed shirts."

Impact and legacy
In 2003, Q Magazine ranked "Groove Is in the Heart" number 323 in their list of the "1001 Best Songs Ever". VH1 ranked it number 67 in their list of "100 Greatest Songs of the 90s" in 2007. Pitchfork named it the 59th best track of the 1990s. They wrote: "With their sass-tastic frontwoman and kitsched-to-death fashion sense, Deee-Lite probably seemed like a good bet at a time when pop's future was still up for grabs. If you were a kid in the 'burbs, they almost resembled a Daisy Age hip-hop group (the day-glo/flower-power look, the Q-Tip guest rap) as much as a house act (a strange urban subculture we had little access to in junior high)."

In 2011, The Guardian featured the song on their "A history of modern music: Dance". In April 2017 the single was re-released on pink vinyl, as part of Record Store Day with remixes of "What Is Love?" on the B-Side. BuzzFeed ranked the song number three in their "The 101 Greatest Dance Songs of the '90s" list in 2017.

In 2018, Time Out ranked it number 23 in their list of "The 100 best party songs", adding, "In this tale of New York's anything-is-possible East Village of the late '80s, a trio of candy-coloured club kids – Super DJ Dmitri, Lady Miss Kier and Towa Tei – decide to form a band. The threesome (with a little help from ringers Q-Tip, Maceo Parker and Bootsy Collins) come up with 'Groove Is in the Heart', a sweetly innocent percolator of a tune that, against all odds, becomes the worldwide club smash of 1990. True story!"

In 2021, Rolling Stone ranked "Groove Is in the Heart" number 233 in its updated list of The 500 Greatest Songs of All Time, calling it "a collage across different generations of funkateers."

In 2022, The Guardian ranked it number 18 in their list of "The 70 Greatest No 2 Singles – Ranked!". Alexis Petridis wrote, "If they’d had another song remotely as good as "Groove Is in the Heart"’s stew of samples, effortless pop melodies and interjections from Bootsy Collins and Q-Tip, Deee-Lite would have been huge. They didn’t, but this joyous pop-disco classic will be played at parties for eternity."

Accolades

(*) indicates the list is unordered.

Samples used
This is an incomplete list of samples used in the song.

Bel-Sha-Zaar with Tommy Genapopoluis and the Grecian Knights – "Introduction" from the album The Art of Belly Dancing, 1969, Gateway: GSLP 3527 (intro music, vocal sample: "We're going to dance, and have some fun")
Herbie Hancock – "Bring Down the Birds" from the soundtrack album Blow-Up, 1966 (bassline)
Vernon Burch – "Get Up" from the album Get Up, 1979 (drums, crowd noise, slide whistle)
Ray Barretto – "Right On" from the album Barretto Power, 1972 (cowbell)
Theme from the TV series Green Acres, 1965 (vocal sample: looped "I" sample ("I-i-i-i-i-i"), sung by Eva Gabor)
Ralph MacDonald – "Jam on the Groove" from the album Sound of a Drum, 1976 (percussion)
Billy Preston – "Uptight" from the album Wildest Organ in Town!, 1966 (breakbeat under rap by Q-Tip)
The Headhunters – "God Make Me Funky" from the album Survival of the Fittest, 1975 (drum fill)
Hateful Head Helen – "Hateful Head Helen", 1989 (vocal sample: "blulululu")

Track listings

 CD maxi – Europe
"Groove Is in the Heart" (meeting of the minds mix) – 5:14
"Groove Is in the Heart" (peanut butter mix) – 3:31
"What Is Love?" (holographic goatee mix) – 4:10
"What Is Love?" (rainbow beard mix) – 4:04

 CD maxi – US
"Groove Is in the Heart" (LP version) – 3:55
"Groove Is in the Heart" (peanut butter radio mix) – 3:32
"Groove Is in the Heart" (meeting of the minds mix) – 5:14
"Groove Is in the Heart" (Jelly Jam beats) – 2:12
"What Is Love?" (holographic goatee mix) – 4:13
"What Is Love?" (frenchapella) – 0:57
"What Is Love?" (rainbow beard mix) – 4:03

 2017 Record Store Day Re-Release
A1. "Groove Is in the Heart" (Meeting of the Minds mix)
A2. "Groove Is in the Heart" (Peanut Butter mix)
A3. "Groove Is in the Heart" (Jelly Jam Beats)
B1. "What Is Love?" (Holographic Goatee mix)
B2. "What Is Love?" (Frenchapella)
B3. "What Is Love?" (Rainbow Beard mix)

 7-inch single
"Groove Is in the Heart" (peanut butter mix) – 3:29
"What Is Love?" (holographic goatee mix) – 4:10

 12-inch maxi
"Groove Is in the Heart" (meeting of the minds mix) – 5:10
"Groove Is in the Heart" (peanut butter mix) – 3:29
"What Is Love?" (holographic goatee mix) – 4:10
"What Is Love?" (rainbow beard mix) – 4:02

 Digital single
"Groove Is in the Heart" – 3:54
"Groove Is in the Heart" (Bootsified to the Nth Degree) – 5:04
"Groove Is in the Heart" (Meeting the Minds Mix) – 5:10
"Groove Is in the Heart" (Peanut Butter Mix) – 3:29
"Groove Is in the Heart" (Jelly Jam Beats) – 2:12
"Groove Is in the Heart" (Instrumental) – 3:45
"Groove Is in the Heart" (Acapella) – 3:38
"Groove Is in the Heart" (Extended Version) – 4:59

Performers
Credits adapted from the album liner notes for World Clique.
Lady Miss Kier – lead and background vocals
Q-Tip – rap
Bootsy Collins – background vocals
Maceo Parker – saxophone
Fred Wesley – trombone

Charts and certifications

Weekly charts

Year-end charts

Certifications and sales

Cover versions
American retail chain Target Corporation used the song, as performed by Charli XCX with Questlove and Black Thought from the Roots, in a series of 2015 television advertisements.

See also
List of number-one singles in Australia during the 1990s
List of RPM number-one dance singles of 1990
List of number-one dance singles of 1990 (U.S.)

References

1990 debut singles
1990 songs
Deee-Lite songs
Elektra Records singles
Number-one singles in Australia
Songs written by Herbie Hancock
Songs written by Q-Tip (musician)
Songs written by Towa Tei
Songs about music